Somebody Up There Likes Me (Chinese: 浪漫風暴) is a 1996 Hong Kong action romance film directed by Patrick Leung and starring Aaron Kwok, Carmen Lee and a special appearance by Sammo Hung.

Plot
With encouragement from his girlfriend, Gloria (Carmen Lee), Ken Wong (Aaron Kwok), a rebellious and stubborn youth, decides to focus on  kickboxing. During a match, Ken accidentally kills Gloria's older brother, Rocky (Michael Tong), and the two break up. Ken is unwilling to give up his kickboxing career and seeks tuition from kickboxing master, Black Jack Hung (Sammo Hung). He also manages to reconcile with Gloria, who supports Ken returning to the ring to complete her brother's wish to challenge Yamada Motokazu (Sawada Kenya), the kickboxing champion of Asia. Due to constantly suffering blows to his head, Ken's is physically traumatized and once able to defeat Yamada, he also collapses.

Cast

Aaron Kwok as Ken Wong
Carmen Lee as Gloria Chan
Sammo Hung as Black Jack Hung (special appearance)
Michael Tong as Rocky Chan
Hilary Tsui as Pam
May Law as Ken's mother
Sawada Kenya as Yamamda Moyokazu
Jun Kunimura as Yamada's manager
Vincent Kok as Loud Boxing Spectator
Clifton Ko as Pau
Ann Hui as Teacher
Lawrence Ah Mon as Doctor
Bonnie Wong as Gloria and Rocky's mother
Perry Chiu as Ken's sister
Chan Tak-hing as Big B / Den
Ken Lok as Pang
Fruit Chan as Policeman
Alan Mak as Policeman
Benny Lam as Po
Lee Man-piu as Ken's Former Master
Winston Yeh as Keith Wong (Ken's father)
Chang Yuk-chuen as Chuen

Box office
The film grossed HK$11,611,563 at the Hong Kong box office during its theatrical run from 12 January to 14 February 1996 in Hong Kong.

Accolades

External links

Somebody Up There Likes Me at Hong Kong Cinemagic

Somebody Up There Likes Me film review at LoveHKFilm.com

1996 films
1996 action films
1996 romantic drama films
1996 martial arts films
Hong Kong action films
Hong Kong martial arts films
Hong Kong romance films
Kickboxing films
Underground fighting films
Martial arts tournament films
1990s Cantonese-language films
Sports fiction
Films set in Hong Kong
Films shot in Hong Kong
1990s Hong Kong films